The Astro-Zombies is a 1968 American science fiction horror film written, directed and produced by Ted V. Mikels and starring John Carradine, Wendell Corey, and Tura Satana.

Plot 

A disgruntled scientist who, having been fired by the space agency, decides to create superhuman monsters from the body parts of innocent murder victims. The creatures eventually escape and go on a killing spree, attracting the attention of both an international spy ring and the CIA.

Cast 
 Wendell Corey as Holman
 John Carradine as Dr. DeMarco
 Tom Pace as Eric Porter
 Joan Patrick as Janine Norwalk
 Tura Satana as Satana
 Rafael Campos as Juan
 Joseph Hoover as Chuck Edwards
 Victor Izay as Dr. Petrovich
 William Bagdad as Franchot
 Vincent Barbi as Tyros
 Vic Lance as the chauffeur
 Egon Sirany as Sergio Demozhenin
 Rod Wilmoth as Astro-Zombie

Production 
Mikels said he started writing it when he made his first film, Strike Me Deadly.

Produced by Ram Ltd. and Ted V. Mikels Film Production, The Astro-Zombies was filmed on a low budget of $37,000, with $3,000 of the budget used to pay Carradine. The film would be Mikels' last collaboration with Wayne M. Rogers (of later M*A*S*H fame), who also co-wrote and co-produced the film.

Mikels remembers it as "a very easy shoot. I shot half of it myself because I only had money for a crew for two weeks, so I spent two weeks shooting all the stuff around town, all the chases and all that".

The score was written by Nico Karaski, cinematography was handled by Robert Maxwell and editing by Art Names.

Release and reception 
The Astro-Zombies was released in May 1968, at a runtime of 94 minutes.

Variety wrote: "There's almost nothing good to say for this horror scifier ... The scifi aspects don't enthrall and the thrill aspects don't shock". Author and film critic Leonard Maltin awarded the film the lowest possible rating of "Bomb", calling it "yet another nominee for worst picture of all time". On his website Fantastic Movie Musings and Ramblings, Dave Sindelar called the film "wretched", criticizing the film's messy plot and "talky/dull" scenes. TV Guide called the film "one of the all-time worst sci-fi pictures".

In a retrospective review, David Cornelius of eFilmCritic.com gave the film 1 out of 5 stars, calling it the worst film ever made, and criticized the film's acting, its "painful-to-the-eyes production values", and the film's absence of reason.

Sequels 
Nearly 40 years after the film's release, Mikels would direct three low-budget sequels starting with 2004's Mark of the Astro-Zombies, 2010's Astro-Zombies M3: Cloned, and 2012's Astro-Zombies M4: Invaders from Cyberspace. Tura Satana would return for the second and third films but not the fourth.

Influence 
American horror punk band the Misfits recorded a song titled "Astro Zombies", released on their 1982 album Walk Among Us. The lyrics, by frontman Glenn Danzig, were written from the perspective of mad scientist Dr. DeMarco. The film was spoofed in 2016 by comedians Michael J. Nelson, Bill Corbett, and Kevin Murphy for Rifftrax.

References

External links 
 
  theatrical trailer
 

1968 films
1968 horror films
1960s English-language films
1960s monster movies
1960s science fiction horror films
American zombie films
American science fiction horror films
American exploitation films
Mad scientist films
Films directed by Ted V. Mikels
1960s American films